Rashtra Sant Tukdoji Regional Cancer Hospital & Research Centre (RSTRCH) is a state-owned cancer care hospital and research centre in Nagpur, Maharashtra. It was founded on 10 March 1974 as Rashtra Sant Tukdoji Cancer Hospital. It was approved as a Regional Cancer Centre in 1999.

References 

Hospital buildings completed in 1974
Regional Cancer Centres in India
Research institutes in Nagpur
Hospitals in Maharashtra
Buildings and structures in Nagpur
Science and technology in Nagpur
1974 establishments in Maharashtra
20th-century architecture in India